In computer architecture, 1-bit integers or other data units are those that are  (1/8 octet) wide. Also, 1-bit central processing unit (CPU) and arithmetic logic unit (ALU) architectures are those that are based on registers of that size.

There are no computers or microcontrollers of any kind that are exclusively 1-bit for all registers and address buses. A 1-bit register can only store 21 different values, i.e. 0 or 1 (off or on, respectively). This is very restrictive and therefore not enough for a program counter which, on modern systems, is implemented in an on-chip register, that isn't implemented on-chip in some 1-bit systems. Opcodes for at least one 1-bit processor architecture were 4-bit and the address bus was 8-bit.

While 1-bit CPUs are obsolete, the first carbon nanotube computer from 2013 is a 1-bit one-instruction set computer (and has only 178 transistors).

1-bit
A serial computer processes data a single bit at a time. For example, the PDP-8/S was a 12-bit computer using a 1-bit ALU, processing the 12 bits serially.

An example of a 1-bit computer built from discrete logic SSI chips is the Wang 500 (1970/1971) calculator as well as the Wang 1200 (1971/1972) word processor series developed by Wang Laboratories.

An example of a 1-bit architecture that was marketed as a CPU is the Motorola MC14500B Industrial Control Unit (ICU), introduced in 1977 and manufactured at least up into the mid 1990s. Its manual states:

One of the computers known to be based on this CPU was the WDR 1-bit computer. A typical sequence of instructions from a program for a 1-bit architecture might be:

 load digital input 1 into a 1-bit register;
 OR the value in the 1-bit register with input 2, leaving the result in the register;
 write the value in the 1-bit register to output 1.

This architecture was considered superior for programs making decisions rather than performing arithmetic computations, for ladder logic as well as for serial data processing.

There are also several design studies for 1-bit architectures in academia, and corresponding 1-bit logic can also be found in programming.

Other examples of 1-bit architectures are programmable logic controllers (PLCs), programmed in instruction list (IL).

Several early massively parallel computers used 1-bit architectures for the processors as well. Examples include the May 1983 Goodyear MPP and the 1985 Connection Machine. By using a 1-bit architecture for the individual processors a very large array (e.g. the Connection Machine had 65,536 processors) could be constructed with the chip technology available at the time. In this case the slow computation of a 1-bit processor was traded off against the large number of processors.

1-bit CPUs can now be considered obsolete; not many kinds have ever been produced, still  some MC14500B chips are available from brokers for obsolete parts.

See also 
 Bit-serial architecture
 Bit banging
 Bit slicing
 Turing machine

References

Further reading

External links 
 

Data unit
Programmable logic controllers